AC Hotels by Marriott is a chain of hotels in Austria, Brazil, Chile, Denmark, France, Germany, Italy, Malaysia, Portugal, Latvia, Poland, Slovakia, Spain, Turkey, Jamaica, the United Kingdom, and North America. The brand's amenities include accommodation, dining, corporate programs, meeting and conference rooms, and facilities for weddings. It serves business and leisure travelers.

History
In 1997, Antonio Catalán founded AC in Madrid, Spain. In the aftermath of the 2008 global financial crisis, occupancy levels dropped by half at many Spanish hotels. Business austerity measures resulted in conference cancellations and widespread bans on business trips for several years. The downturn forced AC to team with a major Spanish rival in 2009 in a management deal that cut costs at both chains. The chain rebranded after a needed, but undisclosed, investment by Marriott. A new joint company assumed the management, but property ownerships remained with existing parties.

The company was known as AC Hoteles S.A., becoming AC Hotels after Marriott’s purchase of the chain on June 8, 2011. The Spanish corporation is known as Belagua 2013.

Since June 8, 2011, AC Hotels by Marriott has operated as a subsidiary of Marriott International, and is now based at Marriott's headquarters in Bethesda, Maryland. Antonio Catalán remained as CEO. As of June 30, 2020, it had 170 hotels with 25,811 rooms in addition to 135 hotels with 23,172 rooms in the pipeline.

Accommodations

Historical

From 2015

References

External links 
 
 

Hospitality companies of Spain
Companies based in Bethesda, Maryland
Marriott International brands